Charles Daniel French (January 26, 1884 – May 3, 1954) was a Canadian politician and a Member of the Legislative Assembly of Quebec.

Background 

He was born in Scotstown, Eastern Townships on January 26, 1884 and married Emily Christina Macaulay in 1914.

Political career 

French ran as a Union Nationale candidate in the provincial district of Compton in the 1939 election and was defeated by Liberal incumbent William James Duffy.

Following Duffy's death in 1946, a by-election was called. French successfully ran and became a Member of the Legislative Assembly (MLA). He was re-elected in the 1948 and 1952 elections.

He was appointed to Maurice Duplessis's Cabinet and served as Minister of Mining from 1948 until his death.

Retirement 

French died in office on May 3, 1954. He was succeeded by his brother John William French.

References 

1884 births
1954 deaths
People from Estrie
Union Nationale (Quebec) MNAs